The Hidden shift problem states: Given an oracle  that encodes two functions  and , there is an n-bit string  for which  for all . Find . Many functions, such as the Legendre symbol and Bent functions, satisfy these constraints. The difference between the Hidden subgroup problem and the Hidden shift problem is that the former focuses on the underlying group while the latter focuses on the underlying ring or field.

References

Quantum algorithms